Elisabeth Ida Marie Flickenschildt (16 March 1905 – 26 October 1977) was a German actress, producer and author. She appeared in dozens of German language films and television productions between 1935–1976.

Flickenschildt was born in Hamburg, and died in Guderhandviertel. A street, Elisabeth-Flickenschildt-Straße, was named for her in Spandau, Berlin.

Selected filmography

 Großreinemachen (1935) - Frau Paulsen
 The Unsuspecting Angel (1936) - Lotte Grün
 Du kannst nicht treu sein (1936) - Miss Nelly
 Strife Over the Boy Jo (1937) - Hafenmädchen
 The Broken Jug (1937) - Frau Brigitte
 Tango Notturno (1937) - Bessie Godfrey
 Starke Herzen (1937) - Ilse
 The Muzzle (1938) - Dame beim Verhör
 The Marriage Swindler (1938) - Frau Buschko
  (1938) - Maruschka
 A Girl Goes Ashore (1938) - Erna Quandt
 Unsere kleine Frau (1938)
 Mia moglie si diverte (1938) - (uncredited)
 The False Step (1939) - Marietta Tripelli
 The Merciful Lie (1939) - Vera Holster
 Robert Koch (1939) - Baronin von Kossin
 Die unheimlichen Wünsche (1939) - Blanchette, Besitzerin einer Schenke
 The Fox of Glenarvon (1940) - Brigit Erskynne
 Trenck, der Pandur (1940) - Natalie Alexandrowa Fürstin Solojew
 Ohm Krüger (1941) - Frau Kock
 The Great King (1942) - Spiller's Wife
 Between Heaven and Earth (1942) - Wirtin
 Rembrandt (1942) - Geertje Dierks
 Liebesgeschichten (1943) - Fräulein Klehps
 Altes Herz wird wieder jung (1943) - Heinrichs Frau Jenny Hoffmann
 Romance in a Minor Key (1943) - Doorkeeper's wife
 Die beiden Schwestern (1943) - Gräfin Holstein
 The Buchholz Family (1944) - Kathinka Bergfeldt
 Marriage of Affection (1944) - Kathinka Bergfeldt
 Seinerzeit zu meiner Zeit (1944) - Frau Revisor
 Philharmoniker (1944) - Fuchs, Konzertagentin
 Der Mann, dem man den Namen stahl (1944) - Hella
 Meine Herren Söhne (1945) - Frau Suhrmöller, Wirtschafterin
 Shiva und die Galgenblume (1945)
 Eine große Liebe (1949) - Die Barfrau
 Madonna in Chains (1949) - Gabriele Custodis
 King for One Night (1950) - Wilma
 A Rare Lover (1950) - Madame Laroche
 Toxi (1952) - Tante Wally
 The Day Before the Wedding (1952) - Frau Plitzka
 Hocuspocus (1953) - Zeugin Kiebutz
 The Night Without Morals (1953) - Martha, Abruzzos verlassene Frau
 Wedding Bells (1954) - Valesca Lautenschläger
 The Perfect Couple (1954) - Baronin Windschildt, Heiratsvermittlerin
 Ein toller Tag (1954) - Marzelline, Housekeeper
 Captain Wronski (1954) - Jadwiga, seine Schwester
 The Spanish Fly (1955) - Helene
 Son Without a Home (1955) - Anna Hartmann
 King in Shadow (1957) - Queen Juliane
 The Girl and the Legend (1957) - Miss Hackett
 Scampolo (1958) - Marietta
 Resurrection (1958) - Agrafena
 Stefanie (1958) - Wirtschafterin Frau Hantke
 Wir Wunderkinder (1958) - Mary Meisegeier
 Labyrinth (1959) - Frau Gretzer
 Mrs. Warren's Profession (1960) - Kitty Warrens Mutter
 The Terrible People (1960) - Mrs. Revelstoke
 Faust (1960) - Marthe Schwerdtlein
 Die Brücke des Schicksals (1960) - Frau Kossitzki
 Agatha, Stop That Murdering! (1960) - Sylvia Brent, seine Tante
  (1961) - Hortense Edle von Padula
 Doctor Sibelius (1962) - Helene Sebald
 The Inn on the River (1962) - Nelly Oaks
 Das schwarz-weiß-rote Himmelbett (1962) - Arabelle, Jean Tante und Vertraute
 The Indian Scarf (1963) - Lady Emily Lebanon
 Ferien vom Ich (1963) - Gräfin Zita
  (1963) - Ältere Dame
 The Phantom of Soho (1964) - Joanna Filiati
 Dog Eat Dog (1964) - Lady Xenia
 Lausbubengeschichten (1964) - Tante Frieda
  (1965) - Charly's Mother
 Un milliard dans un billard (1965) - Madame Ralton
 Aunt Frieda (1965) - Tante Frieda
 Onkel Filser – Allerneueste Lausbubengeschichten (1966) - Tante Frieda
  (1967) - the Abbess
 When Ludwig Goes on Manoeuvres (1967) - Aunt Frieda
  (1967, TV Mini-Series) - Edna Stone
 Dr. med. Fabian - Lachen ist die beste Medizin (1969) - Oberschwester Esmeralda
 Käpt'n Rauhbein aus St. Pauli (1971) - Lady Scarlett
 When Mother Went on Strike (1974) - Tante Clarissa Habinger
 Undine 74 (1974) - Nixe Aja
  (1976) - Frau Burgmann - Edgar's mother
 Golden Night (1976) - Anna, la mère de Michel (final film role)

References

External links

Literature on Elisabeth Flickenschildt

German film actresses
German television actresses
1905 births
1977 deaths
Best Actress German Film Award winners
Commanders Crosses of the Order of Merit of the Federal Republic of Germany
German film producers
20th-century German actresses
20th-century German writers
20th-century German women writers
Actresses from Hamburg
Film people from Hamburg